Whistler/Green Lake Water Aerodrome  is located on Green Lake adjacent to Whistler, in British Columbia, Canada. 

It offers glacier tours, twice daily scheduled service between Vancouver Harbour Flight Centre, Vancouver International Water Airport and Victoria Inner Harbour Airport, and custom charter services, with float equipped DHC-3 Turbine Otter and DHC-2 Beaver aircraft.

Airlines and destinations

References

Seaplane bases in British Columbia
Whistler, British Columbia
Registered aerodromes in British Columbia